The West Trans–New Guinea languages are a suggested linguistic linkage of Papuan languages, not well established as a group, proposed by Malcolm Ross in his 2005 classification of the Trans–New Guinea languages. Ross suspects they are an old dialect continuum, because they share numerous features that have not been traced to a single ancestor using comparative historical linguistics. The internal divisions of the languages are also unclear. William A. Foley considers the TNG identity of the Irian Highlands languages at least to be established.

Classification
The West Trans–New Guinea languages are a group of small families and isolates within Trans–New Guinea which are only tentatively connected. The Irian Highlands families (Dani and Paniai Lakes) appear to belong together, and the Timor and West Bomberai languages share two probable innovations in their pronouns, compared to the rest of TNG. 

The following classification is from Ross (2005), Schapper et al. (2012), and Holton et al. (2012).

West Trans–New Guinea linkage.
Irian Highlands?
 Dani family
 Paniai Lakes (Wissel Lakes) family 
West Bomberai – Timor–Alor–Pantar?
 West Bomberai family
 Oirata–Makasai family
Bunak 
 Alor–Pantar family
Teiwa
Nedebang
Kaera
Western Pantar (Lamma)

Bunak and the Alor–Pantar languages are sometimes grouped together as "West Timor".

The Savu languages (Hawu and Dhao) appear to be non-Austronesian, but do not align with the languages of Timor and Alor. Indeed, most of the languages of East Nusa Tenggara and Maluku appear to have some non-Austronesian influence.

Pronouns are:

{|
! !!sg!!pl
|-
!1
|*na||*ni
|-
!2
|*ka||*ki
|}

reflecting pTNG *na, *ni, *ga, *gi.  The pTNG dual/inclusive *-pi- may be reflected in East Timor 1excl *ini, 1incl *api, in West Timor *ni, *pi, and reversed in West Bomberai *bi, *in, but are not attested from the Irian Highlands.  The *k of the second person is only found on the mainland; in TAP the forms are *a and *i.

History of the proposal
Despite their geographic proximity, the Papuan languages of Timor are not closely related, and demonstration of a relationship between any of them is difficult, apart from the clearly related Alor–Pantar languages on the islands neighboring Timor.

Arthur Capell first proposed that the Timor languages were a family in 1941, and Watuseke & Anceaux did the same for Timor–Alor–Pantar in 1973. Both units have been broken up in more recent classifications, though their ultimate relationship is generally accepted.

In 1957 HKL Cowan linked the Timor languages to the West Papuan family. However, when Stephen Wurm expanded Trans–New Guinea in 1975, he decided Timor–Alor–Pantar belonged there, and he linked it to the South Bird's Head languages in a South Bird's Head – Timor–Alor–Pantar branch of that phylum. Wurm noted similarities with West Papuan, a different family, but suggested this was due to substratum influence.

Of the Irian Highlands families, Capell linked the Dani languages to Kwerba in 1962. Wurm added Dani-Kwerba, the Wissel Lakes (Paniai Lakes) languages, and South Bomberai to TNG as separate branches of that family. Ross (2005) suggests a possible link between Dani and Paniai with his West TNG proposal, but excludes South Bird's Head as a separate branch of TNG, and Kwerba as belonging to a different family altogether. He did not note any connections to West Papuan.

Vocabulary
Dani and Ekagi basic vocabulary from William A. Foley (1986):

{| class="wikitable sortable"
! gloss !! Dani !! Ekagi
|-
| ‘two’ || bite || wiya
|-
| ‘man’ || ap || yame
|-
| ‘water’ || i || uwo
|-
| ‘fire’ || idu || bodiya
|-
| ‘tree’ || e || piya
|-
| ‘leaf’ || ega || iye
|-
| ‘root’ || omagen || mani
|-
| ‘house’ || o || owaa
|-
| ‘breast’ || eɗak || ama
|-
| ‘tooth’ || aik || ego
|-
| ‘bone’ || -oak || mitoo
|-
| ‘ear’ || -atuk || gapa
|-
| ‘hair’ || -eti || iyo
|-
| ‘leg’ || -esok || bo
|-
| ‘blood’ || mep || emo
|-
| ‘hand’ || -egi || gane
|-
| ‘egg’ || tewe-gen || napo
|-
| ‘sun’ || mo || tani
|-
| ‘axe’ || posiye || 
|-
| ‘netbag’ || su || agiya
|-
| ‘eat’ || na- || nai-
|-
| ‘die’ || kagi- || bokai-
|-
| ‘say’ || i- || tii-
|-
| ‘give’ || et- || mai-
|-
| ‘big’ || gok || ebo
|}

References

Trans–New Guinea languages
Proposed language families
Languages of western New Guinea